A universal Taylor series is a formal power series , such that for every continuous function  on , if , then there exists an increasing sequence  of positive integers such thatIn other words, the set of partial sums of  is dense (in sup-norm) in , the set of continuous functions on  that is zero at origin.

Statements and proofs 
Fekete proved that a universal Taylor series exists.

References 

Mathematical series